The canton of Pontivy is an administrative division of the Morbihan department, northwestern France. Its borders were modified at the French canton reorganisation which came into effect in March 2015. Its seat is in Pontivy.

It consists of the following communes:
 
Baud
Gueltas
Guénin
Guern
Kerfourn
Melrand
Noyal-Pontivy
Pluméliau-Bieuzy
Pontivy
Saint-Barthélemy
Saint-Gérand-Croixanvec
Saint-Gonnery
Saint-Thuriau
Le Sourn

References

Cantons of Morbihan